State Route 253 (SR 253), also known as Concord Road, is a west–east road located in Middle Tennessee. It is a secondary route that starts from Brentwood, Tennessee and ends just north of Nolensville.

Route description 
SR 253 begins in Brentwood, in Williamson County with a junction with US 31 (SR 6). It intersects I-65 at the Exit 71 interchange. It ends in southern Davidson County at an intersection with Nolensville Road (US 31A/US 41A/SR 11) just north of the Williamson/Davidson County line.

Points of interest 
The following is a list of landmarks visible from SR 253. 
WSM radio transmitting facility and tower 
Tower Park
Concord Park

Major intersections

References 
 

253 
Transportation in Williamson County, Tennessee
Transportation in Davidson County, Tennessee